Edmond Thomas Quinn (1868 in Philadelphia, Pennsylvania – September 1929 in New York City) was an American sculptor and painter. He is best known for his bronze statue of Edwin Booth as Hamlet, which stands at the center of Gramercy Park in New York City. His larger-than-lifesize bronze bust of Victor Herbert stands near The Pond in Central Park, New York City.

Education

He studied painting at the Pennsylvania Academy of Fine Arts under Thomas Eakins. Following Eakins's February 1886 forced-resignation from PAFA, Quinn followed him to the Art Students League of Philadelphia, and later became that short-lived school's curator. In Paris he trained for a time as a sculptor in the studio of  Jean Antoine Injalbert.

Career
He exhibited regularly at the National Academy of Design, showing paintings in 1891, 1893, 1905, 1906 and 1907. He first showed his sculpture there in 1908, and annually for many years, usually portrait busts. He won a silver medal for his bronze sculpture of model Audrey Munson at the Panama-Pacific Exposition, San Francisco, 1915. He also exhibited at the Pennsylvania Academy of Fine Arts (paintings: 1891, 1894, 1897; sculptures: 1899, 1901, 1905–06, 1908–10, 1914–16, 1921, 1923, 1925–26, 1928, posthumously 1930), and the Art Institute of Chicago.

He was elected an Associate of the National Academy of Design in 1920, and was a member of the National Sculpture Society, the Century Association, the American Academy of Arts and Letters, and the Players Club, for whom he executed his statue of Booth.

Quinn was recognized as being a fine portraitist whose work "shows taste and conscience." His portrait busts include Franklin Hooper, Sylvester Malone, Edwin Markham, Vicente Blasco Ibáñez, Padraic Colum  and Eugene O'Neill. His half-length, oil-on-canvas portrait of Attilio Piccirilli, the sculptor whose studio executed many works of American Beaux-Arts masters, is in the National Academy of Design, as are his painted portraits of Furio Piccirilli and Sherry E. Fry. The National Portrait Gallery has a large number of his portrait busts. 

Death
Quinn was found drowned off Governors Island, New York City in September 1929, a suicide.  Quinn had tried to kill himself four months earlier by drinking poison.

Quinn's papers are at Yale University.

Selected works

Paintings
 Clown (oil on canvas, 1895), La Salle University Art Museum, Philadelphia, Pennsylvania.
 Portrait of Attilio Piccirilli (oil on canvas, 1911), National Academy of Design, New York City.
 Portrait of Sherry E. Fry (oil on canvas, 1915), National Academy of Design, New York City.
 Portrait of Furio Piccirilli (oil on canvas, 1919), National Academy of Design, New York City.

Sculptures
 Harry Wright Monument, West Laurel Hill Cemetery, Bala Cynwyd, Pennsylvania (1897). Harry Wright, a member of the National Baseball Hall of Fame, was a player and manager whose last position was as manager of the Philadelphia team in the National League..
 William Howard (Portrait of a Seated Man), Howard Memorial Cathedral (Masonic), Williamsport, Pennsylvania (1905).
 Bust of Edgar Allan Poe, Poe Cottage, Bronx, New York (1908).
 Zoroaster (Persian Religion and Philosophy), Brooklyn Institute of Arts and Sciences, Brooklyn, New York (1909–10). This architectural sculpture is approximately 12 feet (3.65 m) tall.
 Architectural sculpture, Pittsburgh Athletic Association, Pittsburgh, Pennsylvania (1911), Benno Janssen, architect.
 Figure of a Nymph, Metropolitan Museum of Art, New York City  (1912).
 Relief bust of J. Edward Swanstrom, Columbus Park, Brooklyn, New York (1912).
 Edwin Booth as Hamlet, Gramercy Park, New York City (1918). Commissioned by the Players Club, whose clubhouse had been Booth's house.
 Bust of Professor Franklin W. Hooper, Brooklyn Museum, Brooklyn, New York (1920).
 Bust of Eugene O'Neill, National Portrait Gallery, Washington, DC (1922).
 Bust of Leon Kroll, Whitney Museum of Art, New York City (1924).
 Bust of Victor Herbert, Central Park, New York City (1927).
 Bust of James McNeill Whistler (1928).
 Bust of Dr. J. Marion Sims, South Carolina Statehouse, Columbia, South Carolina (1929), Harold Sterner, architect.
 Henry Clay, Smithsonian American Art Museum, Washington, DC (1929–30). Completed by Francis Herman Packer.
 Bust of Frederick Dana Marsh, Rensselaer Polytechnic Institute, Troy, New York, (year).

War memorials
 Bas reliefs for Battle Monument, Kings Mountain National Military Park, South Carolina  (1908).
 Bust of General Winfield S. Featherston, Vicksburg National Military Park, Vicksburg, Mississippi (1915).
 General John C. Pemberton Monument, Vicksburg National Military Park, Vicksburg, Mississippi (1917).
 Victory, World War I Memorial, Faneuil Park, New Rochelle, New York (1921), Louis R. Metcalfe, architect.

Hall of Fame for Great Americans
 Bust of Edwin Booth (1926), Hall of Fame for Great Americans, Bronx, New York.
 Bust of James Kent (1926), Hall of Fame for Great Americans, Bronx, New York.
 Bust of Oliver Wendell Holmes (1929), Hall of Fame for Great Americans, Bronx, New York.
 Bust of John Quincy Adams (1930, posthumously unveiled), Hall of Fame for Great Americans, Bronx, New York.

References
Sources
Dearinger, David Bernard. Paintings and Sculpture in the Collection of the National Academy of Design 2004:455.

Notes

External links

National Academy of Design associates
American architectural sculptors
1868 births
1929 suicides
Pennsylvania Academy of the Fine Arts alumni
Sculptors who committed suicide
Artists from Philadelphia
Suicides by drowning in the United States
Suicides in New York City
19th-century American painters
American male painters
Painters who committed suicide
19th-century American sculptors
American male sculptors
20th-century American sculptors
20th-century American male artists
Painters from Pennsylvania
20th-century American painters
National Sculpture Society members
Sculptors from Pennsylvania
Students of Thomas Eakins
19th-century American male artists